The  is a railway line of a Japanese private railway operator . The line traverses the northeastern side of the Yōrō Mountains and connects Kuwana Station in Kuwana, Mie Prefecture and Ibi Station in Ibigawa, Gifu Prefecture.

The northern portion of the  section is locally and unofficially called , as Ōgaki is a reversing station.

Kintetsu Railway, one of largest private railway companies in Japan, owns the tracks and rolling stocks of the line whereon Yōrō Railway (II), a wholly owned subsidiary of Kintetsu operates trains as of October 1, 2007.

Descriptions
Company: Yōrō Railway (Category-2), Kintetsu Railway (Category-3)
Length: 
Gauge: 
Power: Electric 1500 V DC
No. of stations: 27 incl. both ends
Track: single
Maximum speed: 
Operation: All Local trains

History
Initially steam powered, the line was constructed by Yōrō Railway (I) and opened in 1913 between  -  - , in 1919 present line was completed with extensions of Yōrō -  and Ikeno - .

With accumulating deficit, Kintetsu Corporation decided to split off the operation of the Yōrō Line in 2007. Local governments along the line made an agreement of financial aid to the Yōrō Railway until 2010.

Stations

Connections
At 
Kintetsu: Nagoya Line
Central Japan Railway Company (JR Central): Kansai Main Line
At 
JR Central: Tōkaidō Main Line (the main line and the "Mino-Akasaka branch line")
Tarumi Railway: Tarumi Line

References
This article incorporates material from the corresponding article in the Japanese Wikipedia

External links
  Official website

Rail transport in Mie Prefecture
Rail transport in Gifu Prefecture
Kintetsu Railway
1067 mm gauge railways in Japan
Railway lines opened in 1913
1913 establishments in Japan